Alberto Galán (November 20, 1901 – January 5, 1977) was a Spanish-born Mexican film actor. He starred in the 1943 film María Candelaria.

Selected filmography
 Juarez and Maximillian (1934)
 Simón Bolívar (1942)
 Another Dawn (1943)
 María Candelaria (1943)
 The House of the Fox (1945)
 Cantaclaro (1946)
 Everybody's Woman (1946)

References

Bibliography
 Mora, Carl J. Mexican Cinema: Reflections of a Society. University of California Press, 1989.

External links

1901 births
1977 deaths
Mexican male film actors
Spanish male film actors
Spanish emigrants to Mexico
People from Cantabria
20th-century Mexican male actors